is a town located in Aomori Prefecture, Japan. , the town had an estimated population of 13,332 in 5450 households, and a population density of 300 persons per km².

Geography
Itayanagi is located at the base of Tsugaru Peninsula in Kitatsugaru District of Aomori Prefecture. The Iwaki River flows through the town.

Neighbouring municipalities
Aomori Prefecture
Aomori
Hirosaki
Goshogawara
Tsuruta
Fujisaki

Climate
The town has a cold humid continental climate (Köppen Dfb) characterized by warm short summers and long cold winters with heavy snowfall. The average annual temperature in Itayanagi is 10.6 °C. The average annual rainfall is 1290 mm with September as the wettest month. The temperatures are highest on average in August, at around 24.1 °C, and lowest in January, at around -1.7 °C.

Demographics
Per Japanese census data, the population of Itayanagi has decreased steadily over the past 60 years.

History
The area around Itayanagi was controlled by the Tsugaru clan of Hirosaki Domain during the Edo period, and was the location of a daikansho. After the Meiji Restoration, it was formed into a village on April 1, 1889 with the establishment of the modern municipalities system. It was elevated to town status on April 1, 1920. On March 10, 1955, Itayanagi annexed the neighboring villages of Hataoka, Koami, and Arakawa.

Government
Itayanagi has a mayor-council form of government with a directly elected mayor and a unicameral town legislature of 12 members.  Kitatsugaru District, less the town of Nakadomari, contributes one member to the Aomori Prefectural Assembly. In terms of national politics, the town is part of Aomori 3rd district of the lower house of the Diet of Japan.

Economy
The economy of Itayanagi is heavily dependent on horticulture, especially for apples, with rice as a secondary crop.

Education
Itayanagi has four public elementary schools and one public junior high school operated by the town government, and one public high school operated by the Aomori Prefectural Board of Education.

Transportation

Railway
 East Japan Railway Company (JR East) -  Gonō Line

Highway

International relations
 Yakima, Washington, United States of America
 Changping District, Beijing, China

Noted people from Itayanagi
Chū Kudō, Manchukuo politician
Hayateumi Hidehito, sumo wrestler
Takamisakari Seiken, sumo wrestler
Kayoko Fukushi, track and field athlete
Mami Matsuyama, pop idol singer
Norio Nagayama, mass murder and novelist

References

External links

 

 
Towns in Aomori Prefecture